Dave Elder may refer to:

 Dave Elder (umpire) (1865–1954), cricket umpire
 Dave Elder (baseball) (born 1975), American Major League Baseball player
 Dave Elder (politician) (born 1942), American politician in the state of California